Johannes Heisig (born 23 April 1953 in Leipzig, East Germany) is a German painter and graphic artist.  His work combines the tradition of German socialist realism with a subjective expressionism. He portrayed several famous German politicians such as Willy Brandt, Johannes Rau and former Finance Minister Peer Steinbrück.
The artist is represented by galerie son, Berlin.

Life 

Heisig comes from a family of artists. His father Bernhard Heisig was the principal of the Old Leipzig School and the teacher of many  artists from the "New Leipzig School"  (i.e. Neo Rauch).

In his father's studio Johannes learned early from his childhood on the art of painting. From 1973 to 1977 he studied Painting and Graphics at the Hochschule für Grafik und Buchkunst Leipzig and from 1978 to 1980 he was Masterstudent with Professor Gerhard Kettner at the Hochschule für Bildende Künste Dresden (HfBK) where he was the president from 1989 to 1991.
After his withdrawing from his long-time teaching activity there he went from Dresden to Berlin.
He was invited to several residency programs at International Universities and worked as a Professor at the Dortmund University (2003–2004).

Work 
Johannes Heisig is known for his graphics and illustrations and his portraits for which he can also be considered a modern court painter.

In 2008 he presented his large works series "es war einmal" (once upon a time) which shows the topic of German separation both from a private and a public view in colored portraits and large black-and-white canvasses with scenes from both West and East. These artworks were presented to the public for the first time in the Berlin House of Representatives in 2008 and then in the German Embassy London.

One of Heisig's favorite subjects is Music. He created several painting and lithograph series inspired by or referring to international musicians like Van Morrison, Tom Waits and Johann Sebastian Bach. 
His large triptych "Be Berlin or: The Unifying Power of Music" shows musicians playing beside John F. Kennedy on his Berlin visit in the 1960s sitting in a car together with Willy Brandt and Konrad Adenauer.

From 2010 to 2011 Heisig created his work series 'CROW' referring to the same-titled poems by Ted Hughes.

Exhibitions  
 2012: "augenscheinlich", Solo exhibition in the Kunstverein Coburg, Coburg
 2011: "ÜBERGÄNGE | CROSSINGS", Willy-Brandt-Haus / galerie son / SEZ, Berlin
 2009: “20 Jahre Deutsche Einheit”, Kunsthalle, Schweinfurt
 2008: "3 berliner", German Embassy, London
 2008: "es war einmal", Berlin House of Representatives
 1990-1994: "New Territory - Art from East Germany", School of the Museum of Fine Arts, Boston / The Art Gallery of the University of Maryland, College Park / Edwin A. Ulrich Museum of Art, Wichita State University, Kansas / LEHIGH ART GALLERIES (Hall and Wilson Gallery) Lehigh University Bethlehem, Pennsylvania / and others, USA
 1992: “TURNING POINTS: EAST GERMAN ART IN REVOLUTION", Sunderland, Carlisle and others, Great Britain
 1992: "To Those Who Begin Again-Art of East Germany", Art Gallery (Williams Centre for the Arts) of the  Lafayette College, Easton, PA /USA
 1989: "The Art of Young Painters of the 1980s from the GDR",  Solothurn/Switzerland
 1989: "Signs of the Times-Paintings and Graphics from the GDR", Tokyo-Nagano- Kumamoto-Kamakura-Kobe/Japan
 1988: "Contemporary Painting of the GDR", Peking, Taiyuan /China
 1986: VI. Triennale of India,  Lalit Kala Akademi, New Delhi /India
 1982: XII. Biennale de Paris, Paris /France

Publications 
 "Johannes Heisig - es war einmal", galerie son, Mihyun Son, Berlin, 2008

Notes

External links 
 galerie son website (English and German)
 the entire 'CROW' series and information on berliner-art.com

1953 births
Living people
20th-century German painters
20th-century German male artists
German male painters
21st-century German painters
21st-century German male artists
German illustrators
Postmodern artists
Artists from Leipzig
Artists from Berlin
Academic staff of the Dresden Academy of Fine Arts
Hochschule für Grafik und Buchkunst Leipzig alumni